Kim Bum-soo is a South Korean singer, regarded as one of the country's best vocalists. His discography consists of eleven studio albums and thirty four singles. He debuted in 1999 with the album A Promise and in 2001, became the first Korean to chart on the Billboard's Hot Singles Sales chart. He is best known for the single "I Miss You" which was released in December 2002 and has sold 2,500,000 copies on Gaon. Its parent album is also his most successful album to date, selling more than 170,000 copies in South Korea where it also peaked at number 6 on the Recording Industry Association of Korea's (RIAK) Monthly Album Sales chart.

After releasing his fifth album So Long..., Kim enlisted in the army to serve his mandatory military service. He returned in 2008 with the album Kim Bum Soo Vol. 6. In 2011, his popularity rose after appearing on the singing competition show I Am a Singer in which he was rewarded a "meritorious graduation" by the show after winning seven consecutive times. All of his covers from the show charted well, with his version of Lee So-ra's "Please" (제발) reaching 2.8 million copies sold on Gaon. His single "Last Love" (끝사랑) from his album Solista Part 2 was also a commercial success, selling over 2,500,000 copies on Gaon. He has since released moderately successful albums and singles as the lead artist and as a featured artist and singles for various films' and television series' soundtracks. He has also collaborated with a number of artists, most notably for the single "Different" (달라) with Girls' Generation member Taeyeon which peaked at number 2 on the Gaon Digital Chart and the singles "Person, Love (사람, 사랑)" and "White Winter (하얀 겨울)" with Lena Park which charted at number 6 and 7 on the Gaon Digital Chart respectively.

Studio albums

Singles

Soundtrack appearances

Covers

Other charted songs

References 
Sources

Pop music discographies
Rhythm and blues discographies
Discographies of South Korean artists